2022 Beledweyne bombings may refer to:

 February 2022 Beledweyne bombing
 March 2022 Somalia attacks
 October 2022 Beledweyne bombings